Dry falls is a waterfall that is no longer supplied with water; a cliff-face that used to be a waterfall.

Dry Falls may refer to:
 Dry Falls, Channeled Scablands, Grant County, Washington, United States
 Sun Lakes-Dry Falls State Park, Channeled Scablands, Grant County, Washington, United States
 Dry Falls (Macon County), North Carolina, United States; a wet waterfall in the Nantahala National Forest on the Cullasaja River; aka Upper Cullasaja Falls
 Dry Falls Dam, Grand Coulee canyon, Grant County, Washington, United States; an impoundment dam filled by water pumped from the Columbia river into the formerly dry canyon; aka South Coulee Dam

See also
 Waterfall (disambiguation)
 Cliff (disambiguation)
 Falls (disambiguation)